West Scrafton is a village and civil parish in Coverdale in the Yorkshire Dales, England. It falls within the Richmondshire district of North Yorkshire. The population was estimated at 70 in 2013.

The village lies on the south bank of the River Cover.

West Scrafton has featured several times in the British television series All Creatures Great and Small, in the episodes "A New Chapter" and "Alarms & Excursions". It is also where James Herriot, whose books were the inspiration for the series, holidayed with his wife, Joan.

Scrafton was mentioned in the Domesday Book.  The name is Old English, from scræf and tūn, meaning "settlement at the hollow". By 1286 Scrafton had been divided into East Scrafton and West Scrafton.  East Scrafton was the smaller place, and is now a hamlet in the neighbouring civil parish of Caldbergh with East Scrafton.

In the Middle Ages West Scrafton was a vill held by the Abbot of Coverham.  It was historically a township in the large ancient parish of Coverham in the North Riding of Yorkshire, and became a separate civil parish in 1866.  In 1974 it was transferred to the new county of North Yorkshire.

It was abandoned in 1914.

References

External links 

  West Scrafton website

Villages in North Yorkshire
Civil parishes in North Yorkshire
Coverdale (dale)